The Arrochar Alps are a group of mountains located around the head of Loch Long, Loch Fyne, and Loch Goil, near the villages of Arrochar and Lochgoilhead, on the Cowal Peninsula in Argyll and Bute, Scotland. The mountains are especially popular with hillwalkers, due to their proximity and accessibility from Glasgow. They are largely within the Loch Lomond and The Trossachs National Park and in part also extend into the Argyll Forest Park. Glens which go into the heart of the range include: Glen Croe, Hell's Glen and Glen Kinglass.

List 
The list below includes the Munros, Munro Tops, Corbetts, Corbett Tops and Grahams.

 Munros:
 Beinn Ìme, 1011 m
 Beinn Bhuidhe, 948 m
 Ben Vorlich, 943 m
 Beinn Narnain, 926 m
 Ben Vane, 915 m
 Munro Tops:
 Ben Vorlich (North Top), 931 m
 Corbetts:
 Beinn an Lochain, 901 m
 The Cobbler (Ben Arthur) 884 m
 Beinn Luibhean, 857 m
 Ben Donich, 847 m
 Binnein an Fhidhleir, 817 m
 The Brack, 787 m
 Beinn Bheula, 779 m
 Cnoc Coinnich, 763 m
 Corbett Tops:
 The Cobbler (North Peak), 870 m
 The Cobbler (South Top), 858 m
 A' Chrois, 848 m
 Beinn Chorranach, 848 m
 Little Hills, 808 m
 The Brack (West), 787 m
 Ben Vorlich (South Top), 780 m
 Beinn Dubh, 773 m
 Grahams:
 Stob an Eas, 732 m
 Beinn Lochain, 703 m
 Stob na Boine Druim-fhinn, 658 m
 Creag Tharsuinn, 643 m
 Cruach nam Mult, 611 m
 Other mountains
 Mullach Coire a' Chuir, 639 m
 Cruach nan Capull, 565 m
 Cruach Tairbeirt, 1362 ft, 415 m
 Beinn Reithe, 
 The Saddle (Lochgoilhead), 521 m
 Clach Bheinn (Lochgoilhead), 437 m
 Tom Molach, 370 m
 Carn Glas, 502 m
 Tom nan Gamhna, 389 m
 The Steeple (Lochgoilhead), 390 m
 Cruach nam Miseag, 606 m

Areas 
 Tarbet (Eastern Gateway alongside Ardlui and Arrochar)
 Arrochar (Eastern Gateway alongside Ardlui and Tarbet
 Succoth, Argyll
 Ardgartan
 Rest and be thankful
 Butterbridge
 Cairndow
 Ardno
 St Catherines
 Strachur (South Western Gateway)
 Lochgoilhead (Heart of the range as it sits on the southern range of mountains of Glen Croe
 Carrick Castle
 Ardlui (Northern and Eastern Gateway alongside Arrochar and Tarbet

Lochs 
 Loch Goil (Heart of the range)
 Loch Restil
 Loch Long
 Loch Lomond
 Loch Sloy
 Loch Fyne

Glens 
 Glenbranter (Parly)
 Hell's Glen
 Glen Kinglas
 Glen Croe
 Glen Loin
 Tarbet
 Glen Falloch
 Glen Fyne

Parks 
 Loch Lomond and the Trossachs National Park
 Argyll Forest Park
 Cowal
 Ardgoil Peninsula

References 

Cowal
Mountains and hills of the Southern Highlands
Mountains and hills of Argyll and Bute
Mountain ranges of Scotland